Mentzelia affinis is a species of flowering plants in the family Loasaceae known by the common name yellowcomet. It is native to the southern half of California, Arizona, and adjacent sections of Nevada and Baja California, where it is known from scrub, woodland, desert sands, and other habitat types.

Description
It is an annual herb growing erect to maximum heights anywhere between 5 centimeters and half a meter. The leaves are up to 17 centimeters long in the basal rosette, divided into lobes and sometimes toothed, and smaller farther up on the plant.

The flower has five shiny yellow petals, each with an orange spot at the base and often a toothed or notched tip. The fruit is a narrow, curving utricle 1 to 3 centimeters long. It contains many tiny prism-shaped seeds.

External links
Jepson Manual Treatment for Mentzelia affinis
Mentzelia affinis — U.C. Photo gallery

affinis
Flora of Arizona
Flora of Baja California
Flora of California
Flora of Nevada
Flora of the California desert regions
Flora of the Sierra Nevada (United States)
Flora of the Sonoran Deserts
Natural history of the California chaparral and woodlands
Natural history of the California Coast Ranges
Natural history of the Central Valley (California)
Natural history of the Channel Islands of California
Natural history of the Colorado Desert
Natural history of the Mojave Desert
Natural history of the Peninsular Ranges
Natural history of the Santa Monica Mountains
Natural history of the Transverse Ranges
Flora without expected TNC conservation status